Baron Alexander von Stieglitz (1814–1884) was a Russian financier. He was the first governor of the State Bank of the Russian Empire, the predecessor organization to today's Central Bank of the Russian Federation.

Early life and education
Stieglitz was born in Saint Petersburg to banker Baron Ludwig von Stieglitz who was a founder of the banking-house "Stieglitz and Co". After completing his education at the University of Dorpat in what is now Tartu, Estonia, he entered the state services as a member of the Manufacture council of the Ministry of Finances of the Russian Empire.

Businessman and civil servant
After the death of his father, Stieglitz inherited the banking-house and succeeded as a banker of the Emperor. In 1840–1850 he successfully sold six 4% government loans to finance the construction of the Moscow – Saint Petersburg Railway and secured a significant foreign loan at the height of  the Crimean War. Stieglitz also owned manufacturing enterprises in Narva and in Catherinehof.

In 1846 Stieglitz was elected the chairman of the Exchange's committee. At that post he took part in all financial operation of the Government of the Russian Empire. In 1857 he co-founded the Society of the Russian Railways. In 1860 Stieglitz liquidated all his commercial enterprises and voluntarily withdrew from the post of the chairman of the Exchange's committee.

On 31 May 1860 Emperor Alexander II established the State Bank of the Russian Empire and Stieglitz became its first governor. In 1866 he left the state service.

Philanthropy
In 1878 he donated funds to build a museum of applied arts for the benefit of students of the Central School of Technical Drawing, which had been established by him earlier.

Awards
Stieglitz received numerous awards, including the Order of St. Stanislav of the 3rd degree, the Order of St. Vladimir of the 4th degree and the Order of St. Anna of the 2nd degree.

References

  Biography at the site of the Bank of Russia
  Celebrating events in memoriam of Alexander von Stieglitz
  History of the Russian Exchange

Jews from the Russian Empire
Bankers from the Russian Empire
Central bankers
Philanthropists from the Russian Empire
University of Tartu alumni
Businesspeople from Saint Petersburg
1814 births
1884 deaths
19th-century philanthropists
Barons of the Russian Empire